ʾAl-e Davoud, Aledavood, is a well-known landowner Iranian family, originally from Khur and Biabanak County, where they owned large tracts of lands before demolition of share cropping system by White Revolution.

The family descends from Hāj Seīd Mīrzā Ghāzī (d.1875) a mystic man and a contemporary of Yaghma Jandaghi, the prominent poet of early 19th century Iran. There was a long conflict between devout and pious Ghāzī and the godless poet, and each lampooned the other in many poems and letters. To put an end to the quarrel, Fātīmeh, a grand daughter of Yaghma was married to Habīb-ollāh, the only son of Ghāzī. From this marriage three sons were born, two of them becoming well known poets and literary figures: Mīrzā Asadollah and Mīrzā Eghbāl. Mīrzā Eghbāl was more accomplished in his literature career than his brother, but except for a scant number of poems, most of his works are lost. Mīrzā Asadollah was a man of letters and talented in calligraphy, while his outstanding gift was improvising poetry. He received the honorable title of Montākhab-ol-Sādāt from a Qajar King. He served the governors of Khur and Biabanak as their secretary for many years, and died in 1932 in Biabanak. He married Fātīmeh Yaghmā'ī a grand daughter of Ahmad Safā'ī son of Yaghma. She gave birth to ten children, the most notable of them are Habīb Yaghmā'ī (1901-1984) and Abdol-Hossaīn ʾAl-e Dāvood (1896-1956).

Habīb Yaghmā'ī was a poet, writer and journalist and founder and editor of Yaghma journal. Abdol-Hossaīn was an accomplished calligrapher and poet under the pen name of Adīb.

References 

Iranian families